Yahenda Joaquim Caires Fernandes, also known as Dias Caires (born April 18, 1978) is a former Angolan football player. He has played for Angola national team.

National team statistics

References

1978 births
Living people
Angolan footballers
Atlético Petróleos de Luanda players
Atlético Sport Aviação players
G.D. Sagrada Esperança players
G.D. Interclube players
Girabola players
Angola international footballers
Association football defenders